Ben Hutton may refer to:

 Ben Hutton (cricketer) (born 1977), English cricketer
 Ben Hutton (ice hockey) (born 1993), Canadian ice hockey player